Faizabad(), Fayzbad, Feyzabad, Feiz Abad, Faiz Abad, and Faizobod may refer to:

Afghanistan
 Fayzabad, Badakhshan, a city in Badakhshan province
 Fayzabad District, Badakhshan, a district in Badakhshan province
 Fayzabad District, Jowzjan, a district in Jowzjan province
 Fayzabad Airport, serving Fayzabad, Badakhshan

China
 Peyziwat County, or Faizabad, a county in Kashgar Prefecture, Xinjiang

India
 Faizabad, a Metropolitan City in Uttar Pradesh state in India
 Faizabad, a historical city and capital of Avadh
 Faizabad division, an administrative geographical unit of Uttar Pradesh state in India
 Faizabad district, a district in Uttar Pradesh, India
 Faizabad (Lok Sabha constituency), a Lok Sabha parliamentary constituency in Uttar Pradesh state in India

Iran

Chaharmahal and Bakhtiari Province
 Feyzabad, Chaharmahal and Bakhtiari, a village in Lordegan County, Chaharmahal and Bakhtiari Province

Fars Province
Feyzabad, Darab, a village in Darab County
Feyzabad, Eqlid, a village in Eqlid County
Feyzabad, Shiraz, a village in Shiraz County

Gilan Province
 Feyzabad, Gilan, a village in Rasht County

Golestan Province
 Feyzabad, Golestan, a city in Gorgan County
 Feyzabad, Aliabad, a city in Aliabad County

Hamadan Province
 Feyzabad, Hamadan, a village in Famenin County, Hamadan Province

Hormozgan Province
 Feyzabad, Hormozgan, a village in Rudan County, Hormozgan Province

Isfahan Province
Feyzabad, Aran va Bidgol, a village in Aran va Bidgol County
Feyzabad, Jarqavieh Olya, a village in Isfahan County
Feyzabad, Jolgeh, a village in Isfahan County
Feyzabad, Nain, a village in Nain County
Feyzabad, Baharestan, a village in Nain County

Kerman Province
 Feyzabad, Rayen, a village in Kerman County, Kerman Province
 Feyzabad, Shahdad, a village in Kerman County, Kerman Province
 Feyzabad, alternate name of Firuzabad, Kerman, a village in Kerman County, Kerman Province
 Feyzabad, Rafsanjan, a village in Rafsanjan County, Kerman Province
 Feyzabad, Dehaj, a village in Shahr-e Babak County, Kerman Province

Khuzestan Province
 Feyzabad, Khuzestan, a village in Andika County, Khuzestan Province

Kurdistan Province
 Feyzabad, Kurdistan, a village in Saqqez County, Kurdistan Province

Lorestan Province
 Feyzabad, Lorestan, a village in Lorestan Province

Markazi Province
 Feyzabad, Ashtian, a village in Ashtian County
 Feyzabad, Zarandieh, a village in Zarandieh County

North Khorasan Province
 Feyzabad, North Khorasan, a village in North Khorasan Province

Qazvin  Province
 Feyzabad, Qazvin, a village in Qazvin Province

Qom Province
 Feyzabad, Qom, a village in Qom Province

Razavi Khorasan Province
 Feyzabad, Razavi Khorasan, a city in Mahvelat County
 Feyzabad, Chenaran, a village in Chenaran County
 Feyzabad, Davarzan, a village in Davarzan County
 Feyzabad, Fariman, a village in Fariman County
 Feyzabad, Firuzeh, a village in Firuzeh County
 Feyzabad, Joghatai, a village in Joghatai County
 Feyzabad, Khvaf, a village in Khvaf County
 Feyzabad (36°10′ N 58°52′ E), Mazul, a village in Nishapur County
 Feyzabad (36°13′ N 58°45′ E), Mazul, a village in Nishapur County
 Feyzabad (36°20′ N 58°45′ E), Mazul, a village in Nishapur County
 Feyzabad-e Lalaha, a village in Nishapur County
 Feyzabad, Rashtkhvar, a village in Rashtkhvar County
 Feyzabad, Taybad, a village in Taybad County
 Feyzabad, Torbat-e Jam, a village in Torbat-e Jam County
 Feyzabad-e Mish Mast, a village in Torbat-e Jam County

Semnan Province

South Khorasan Province
 Feyzabad, Darmian, a village Darmian County
 Feyzabad, Khusf, a village in Khusf County
 Feyzabad, Jolgeh-e Mazhan, a village in Khusf County
 Feyzabad, Qaen, a village Qaen County

Tehran Province
 Feyzabad, Tehran, a village in Tehran Province

West Azerbaijan Province
 Feyzabad, Chaypareh, a village in Chaypareh County
 Feyzabad, Takab, a village in Takab County

Yazd Province
 Feyzabad, Khatam, a village in Khatam County
 Feyzabad-e Kohneh, a village in Abarkuh County
 Feyzabad-e Now, a village in Abarkuh County
 Feyzabad, Taft, a village in Taft County

Zanjan Province
 Feyzabad, Abhar, a village in Abhar County
 Faizabad, Tarom, a village in Tarom County

Pakistan
 Faizabad Interchange, a highway interchange between the cities of Rawalpindi and Islamabad in Pakistan

Tajikistan
 Fayzobod, a town in Tajikistan
 Fayzobod District, a district in Tajikistan

Trinidad and Tobago
 Fyzabad, a town in Trinidad and Tobago